Winogradskyella haliclonae is a Gram-negative, rod-shaped and motile bacterium from the genus of Winogradskyella which has been isolated from the sponge Haliclona.

References

Flavobacteria
Bacteria described in 2017